Carlos Adriano de Sousa Cruz or simply Adriano (born 28 September 1987) is a Brazilian professional footballer who plays as a forward for Jacuipense.

He is also nicknamed Adriano Michael Jackson.

Club career
Adriano played for many Brazilian sides; Ceará, América, Bahia, and Palmeiras. Espescilly, when he was in America-RJ, he played with his role model Romário. Romário came on during the 68th minute of the match between América and Artsul, replacing Adriano.

In Palmeiras, he was a top scorer of the 2011 Copa do Brasil.

Dalian Shide
On 8 June 2011, Adriano transferred to Chinese Super League side Dalian Shide on a four-year deal with a reported fee of $3.8 million. He made his Super League debut for Dalian on 14 June 2011 in a 2–0 home victory against Chengdu Blades, coming on as a substitute for Ahn Jung-Hwan in the second half. His first goal in China came on 7 August 2011, which ensured Dalian Shide a 1–1 draw against Liaoning Whowin. He managed to score 4 goals in 12 appearances in the 2011 league season.

On 26 June 2012, Adriano scored five goals in the third round of the 2012 Chinese FA Cup as Dalian Shide beat League One club Yanbian Baekdu Tigers 8–0 at Jinzhou Stadium. He broke the Chinese FA Cup record for most goals scored in a match (the previous record was four goals, held by Wang Tao in 1998 and Mark Williams in 1999).

Daejeon Citizen
On 13 March 2014, Adriano joined South Korean side Daejeon Citizen in K League 2.

FC Seoul
On 28 July 2015, Adriano joined South Korean side FC Seoul in K League 1.

Adriano scored 35 goals in all competitions in the 2016 season, setting a new record in South Korean football history.

Shijiazhuang Ever Bright 
On 16 January 2017, Shijiazhuang Ever Bright announced that they have signed Adriano.

FC Seoul
On 4 February 2020, Adriano rejoined South Korean side FC Seoul on a one-year contract.

Career statistics

References

External links

1987 births
Living people
Brazilian footballers
Association football forwards
Campeonato Brasileiro Série A players
Campeonato Brasileiro Série B players
Chinese Super League players
China League One players
K League 1 players
K League 2 players
K League 2 Most Valuable Player Award winners
Ceará Sporting Club players
Fluminense FC players
Esporte Clube Bahia players
Sociedade Esportiva Palmeiras players
Atlético Clube Goianiense players
Dalian Shide F.C. players
Cangzhou Mighty Lions F.C. players
Jeonbuk Hyundai Motors players
Daejeon Hana Citizen FC players
FC Seoul players
Brazilian expatriate footballers
Brazilian expatriate sportspeople in China
Expatriate footballers in China
Brazilian expatriate sportspeople in South Korea
Expatriate footballers in South Korea